LacusCurtius is a website specializing in ancient Rome, currently hosted on a server at the University of Chicago. It went online on August 26, 1997; in July 2021 it had "3707 webpages, 765 photos, 772 drawings & engravings, 120 plans, 139 maps." The site is the creation of William P. Thayer.

Overview
The main resources to be found on it include:

 a number of Latin and Greek texts, usually in English translation, and often in the original language as well,
 Smith's Dictionary of Greek and Roman Antiquities,
 Platner's Topographical Dictionary of Ancient Rome,
 several secondary works, mostly on Rome and Roman Britain,
 a photogazetteer of Roman remains and medieval churches of central Italy including the city of Rome,
 an often-cited online copy of Richard Hinckley Allen's Star Names: Their Lore and Meaning,
 the Antiquary's Shoebox, a selection of articles from classical studies journals that are now in public domain.

The parent site also includes a large American history section (mostly military and naval history) and a Gazetteer of Italy; the latter is somewhat of a misnomer, being almost entirely about central Italy, especially Umbria, for which it is a useful source.

In the early days of the site, LacusCurtius was often the only English source online for a number of the primary texts presented. The texts and translations are not scanned, but usually rekeyed by hand from Loeb Classical Library editions that had entered public domain, and less often from other sources. Though many of these primary texts could after a decade be found elsewhere on the web, Thayer's versions feature enhanced functionalities. They provide direct word-links to terms in Smith's Dictionary and other secondary sources on LacusCurtius and elsewhere, and often link quoted or cited passages to the full text of other ancient sources. Thayer corrects typographical errors in the Loeb editions, with a note on the original error, and on occasion provides his own  commentary to update his source material, most of which is near or more than a century old.

In similar fashion, Thayer's edition of Smith's Dictionary is keyed in article by article, and is linked to other entries and to the primary sources cited. Each entry appears on an individual page, except for very short entries, which are collected on alphabetical index pages that link to the major articles. Thayer also provides topical indices for subjects such as the Roman military, law, and daily life. Thayer has stated that his interest in subject matter pertaining to ancient Greece is slim, and his selection from Smith's is predominantly Roman, with Greek topics included as they illuminate Roman texts.

The proper spelling of "LacusCurtius" is as a single CamelCase word, with no space; the idea was to avoid interfering with searches for the original Lacus Curtius in ancient Rome.

References

External links
top-level entry page
LacusCurtius

Ancient Roman studies
History websites of the United States
Discipline-oriented digital libraries
Internet properties established in 1997
American digital libraries